Ghislain Fournier (born 26 August 1938) was a member of the House of Commons of Canada from 1997 to 2004. He is a businessman by career, including real estate work.

He was elected in the Manicouagan electoral district under the Bloc Québécois party in the 1997 and 2000 elections, serving in the 36th and 37th Canadian Parliaments respectively.

Fournier left office in 2004, as he lost the Manicouagan riding's Bloc Québécois candidacy to Gérard Asselin. Asselin won the riding in that year's Canadian general election.

External links
 
 Hill Times: 2004 federal election Quebec profile, 21 June 2004, retrieved 12 July 2006

1938 births
Living people
Bloc Québécois MPs
French Quebecers
Members of the House of Commons of Canada from Quebec
People from Bas-Saint-Laurent
21st-century Canadian politicians